KNPQ (107.3 FM) is a radio station licensed to Hershey, Nebraska, United States, the station serves the North Platte area. The station is currently owned by Eagle Communications. The station has obtained a construction permit from the FCC for a power increase to 100,000 watts.

On December 28, 2020, KNPQ shifted its format to classic country, branded as "Q Country Legends 107.3".

References

External links
Q Country 107.3 Facebook

NPQ
Classic country radio stations in the United States